Inês Herédia (born 1989) is a Portuguese actress and singer. She lives in a lesbian relationship and has twins born by artificial insemination. She, together with her wife, were among the winners of Portugal's Arco-íris (Rainbow) award in 2018 in the category "Coming Out".

Early life
Inês de Herédia Cordovil de Noronha Sanches was born in the Portuguese capital of Lisbon on 27 December 1989. She is the daughter of Luis Filipe Peres de Noronha Sanches and Ana Rita de Herédia Cordovil and has two brothers and a sister. In the early years of her life, she lived in Estoril. Her first theatrical performance was in an amateur musical at the age of 14. She made her professional debut in November 2011 at Lisbon's Teatro Politeama in the musical "Pinocchio", directed by Filipe La Féria. Herédia studied theatre at the National Conservatory in Lisbon. At college she graduated in Tourism Business Management.

Career
In 2012 Herédia participated in the fifth edition of the SIC reality TV programme Idols. Soon after, she studied acting for screen in London at the Musical Theatre Academy.  While there she performed in a number of short films and worked with the director, Mike Leigh. Returning to Portugal, in 2017 she played the character Júlia Marreiros, in Paixão, a soap opera broadcast by SIC. In 2019, she participated in the sixth edition of the TVI program A Tua Cara Não Me É Estranha (Your face is not strange to me).

As a singer, Herédia has released three singles:
Tu Sem Mim with David Carreira
Voltei a Respirar 
I would do it again, which tells of a love story between two women that began during the pandemic.

Personal life
At the age of 24 Herédia concluded that she was a lesbian and decided to announce her homosexuality. In February 2018 she married Maria Gabriela Olival Narciso de Valsassina Sobral (born 1965), who was working as a director of programmes at SIC. On 27 December 2018, she gave birth to twin sons, who had been conceived by artificial insemination from an unknown donor. She has continued to act on television and at the theatre (Casino Estoril) since their birth.

See also
Prémio Arco-íris. Page on Portuguese Wikipedia

References

Portuguese stage actresses
21st-century Portuguese women singers
21st-century Portuguese actresses
Portuguese television personalities
Lesbian singers
1989 births
living people
Portuguese lesbian actresses
Portuguese lesbian musicians
Portuguese LGBT singers